Pediasia cistites is a moth in the family Crambidae. It was described by Edward Meyrick in 1934. It is found in the Democratic Republic of the Congo.

References

Crambini
Moths described in 1934
Moths of Africa